2008 LATAM Challenge Series season was the first season of this championship. LATAM Challenge Series replaced the Formula Renault 2000 de America.

Drivers

Schedule

Results

Races

Standings

References

LATAM Challenge Series
Lat
LATAM Challenge Series races
2008 in North American sport